Clonmethan (formerly also Clonmelkin, Kilmethan,  or Glimmethan) is a townland and a civil parish in the ancient barony of Balrothery West, Fingal in Ireland. It is bordered by the parishes of Palmerstown to the west, Grallagh to the north, Hollywood to the northeast, Westpalstown to the east, Killossery to the southeast, Killsallaghan to the south, and Greenoge, County Meath to the southwest.

History
The parish was historically part of the manor of Swords, which was in the barony of Nethercross, which was formed from those parts of the Liberty of St. Sepulchre outside Dublin city and north of the River Liffey.  The prebend of Clonmethan was one of the original thirteen prebends of St Patrick's Cathedral, Dublin.  In 1675, the Dublin Castle administration by act of council united four other Church of Ireland parishes into the prebend of Clonmethan: Ballyboghill, Ballymadun, Palmerstown, and Westpalstown. The prebend was in the gift of the Archbishop of Dublin. In 1842 the configuration of the Dublin baronies was simplified and Clonmethan was transferred to the barony of Balrothery West. The Manor Courts Abolition (Ireland) Act 1859 abolished the Manor of Swords.

Dalton's account
John D'Alton's History of the county of Dublin, published in 1838, describes Clonmethan thus:

Subdivisions
The parish comprises 10 complete townlands (Brownscross, Cabragh, Clonmethan, Fieldstown, Glebe, Killeen, Moortown, Oldtown, Wolganstown, and Wyanstown) and part of an eleventh (Jordanstown). Many of the townlands are named after former proprietors. Clonmethan gives its name to an electoral division in Fingal, comprising six townlands in the parishes of Clonmethan and Palmerstown: Cabragh, Glebe, Jordanstown, Oldtown, Palmerstown, and Whitestown.

References

Civil parishes of the barony of Balrothery West
Townlands of Fingal